Phaedrotettix concinnus is a species of spur-throated grasshopper in the family Acrididae.

References

 Capinera J.L, Scott R.D., Walker T.J. (2004). Field Guide to Grasshoppers, Katydids, and Crickets of the United States. Cornell University Press.

Further reading

 

Melanoplinae
Insects described in 1897